Hahnstätten is a municipality in the Rhein-Lahn-Kreis, in Rhineland-Palatinate, Germany. It belongs to the association community of Aar-Einrich. It is situated on the river Aar, approx. 10 km south of Limburg an der Lahn, and 35 km east of Koblenz. In 1949 the conductor Bruno Weil was born here.

Hahnstätten was the seat of the former Verbandsgemeinde ("collective municipality") Hahnstätten.

There is a large limestone quarry, operated by Schaefer Kalk.

References

Rhein-Lahn-Kreis